Salamá is a municipality in the Honduran department of Olancho.

Demographics
At the time of the 2013 Honduras census, Salamá municipality had a population of 7,542. Of these, 99.23% were Mestizo, 0.62% Indigenous, 0.12% Black or Afro-Honduran  and 0.03% White.

References

Municipalities of the Olancho Department